Leif Johansson may refer to:

Leif Johansson (bobsleigh) (born 1950), Swedish Olympic bobsledder
Leif Johansson (businessman) (born 1951), Swedish businessman
Leif Johansson (tennis) (born 1952), Swedish former tennis player